Stuart Cameron is a guitarist based in Toronto, Ontario, Canada.  He is the son of John Allan Cameron and is a member of The Heartbroken.  He has recorded and toured with Ashley MacIsaac, Crash Test Dummies, Amanda Marshall, Matthew Good, John Allan Cameron, George Canyon, Gordie Sampson and Shaye.

Cameron is a prominent figure in the Fergus Scottish Festival and Highland Games, in Fergus, Ontario, where he took over as Chieftain of the Games after his father's death. He leads many of the ceremonies and often plays a solo musical act or with Celtic bands who are a part of the festival, such as Tom Leadbeater, Seven Nations, and The Town Pants.

References

External links
 

Canadian rock guitarists
Canadian male guitarists
Living people
Year of birth missing (living people)
Place of birth missing (living people)